The swimming competitions at the 2013 Mediterranean Games in Mersin took place between 21 June and 25 June at the Mersin Olympic Swimming Pool.

Athletes competed in 38 events and 2 paralympic events.

Medal summary

Men's events

Women's events

Paralympic events

Medal table
Key:

References

 
Sports at the 2013 Mediterranean Games
2013
2013 in swimming